The Big Showdown is an American game show that aired on the ABC television network from December 23, 1974 to July 4, 1975. Jim Peck (in his national television debut) hosted the program and Dan Daniel (then a disc jockey on New York City's WHN) served as announcer.

The series was recorded at ABC's New York studio TV15 on West 58 Street, and packaged by Don Lipp’s Daphne Productions and Ron Greenberg, with assistance by MCA Television.

Gameplay

Round 1 (The Big Showdown)
Three contestants competed. Before the round began, Peck announced a target score or "payoff point," and selected a dollar value for it by pressing a buzzer on his podium to stop a randomizer ($25, $50, $75, $100, or $500). He then read a one-point toss-up question. The first contestant to buzz-in and correctly answer it chose from one of six available categories, each with a different point value from 1 to 6 as represented by faces of a die. A correct answer to a question awarded the points for the chosen category and allowed the contestant to select the next one. A miss locked the contestant out of that question and gave the opponents a chance to answer. The payoff point had to be reached exactly, and contestants were not allowed to select or answer any question that would put them over that total, being automatically locked out in the latter case. The first contestant to reach the payoff point won the money associated with it. A new dollar value and payoff point were set, the latter raised by several points above the previous one, and Peck asked a one-point toss-up to award control of the board. A toss-up was also asked whenever all players missed a question.

A new set of categories was introduced after the second payoff point had been reached. Four or more payoff points were played during this round, depending on the speed with which the game progressed.

Each first round was played to a time limit. Although the final ninety seconds of the round were regarded as a speed round, there was no difference in the gameplay. However, each new payoff point set during this time paid off at $100 once hit. Once time ran out, the two highest scorers advanced to the Final Showdown. All contestants kept whatever money they had earned during the game, regardless.

In the event of a tie, Peck asked questions from the one-point category to the tied contestants until the deadlock was broken. Answering correctly allowed the contestant to advance, while an incorrect answer resulted in that contestant being eliminated from the game.

Round 2 (Final Showdown)
The two remaining contestants competed to reach a payoff point of seven. Three categories were played, again represented by faces on a die, and point values were 1, 2, and 3 respectively. The scores were reset to zero, and the contestant who had been in the lead at the end of the first round chose the first category. As before, no contestant could choose or answer a question that would put him/her above the payoff point. The first contestant to reach seven points won the game and an additional $250; both contestants kept any money they had accumulated during the game.

Bonus Round
The champion had a chance to win up to $10,000 by rolling oversized dice. Model Heather Cunningham joined the proceedings to hand the dice to the champion. The sixes on each pair had been replaced with the words "Show" and Down," and the goal was to have both words appear in a single roll. The champion was given one free roll to start the round, and rolling “Show” and “Down” on the first try paid $10,000.

If anything else was showing, the number the champion rolled was set as a payoff point. The lowest number a payoff point could be was one (rolling either "Show" or "Down", which had no singular values, on one die and one on the other), while the highest was ten (both dice showing five). The champion was then given thirty seconds to roll the dice, with Cunningham passing as many pairs to him/her as possible while Peck stood at the end of the dice table to call out the rolls and remove the dice. All rolls had to end with both dice landing in a well at the end of the table, otherwise they were not counted. Rolling the payoff point won $250 each time it was hit, with a roll of "Show-Down" worth an additional $5,000.

If the champion did not roll "Show-Down" after the thirty seconds had expired, but had hit the payoff point at least once, he/she received one last chance to roll the dice to win $5,000. For each roll of the payoff point, the champion received five seconds of bonus rolling time. Once again, the roll of "Show-Down" added $5,000 to the champion's winnings. If the champion did not roll "Show-Down" this time, the round ended and the champion returned on the next show to try to win his/her way back to the dice table to try again. 

Champions remained on the show until they were defeated in the main game, rolled "Show-Down" at any time in the bonus round, or accumulated $20,000 in winnings.

Episode status
The series is believed to have been wiped due to network practices of the era. An audio clip of the opening to one episode also exists, as well as audio of the complete series finale. Two episodes also exist on videotape: the 1974 pilot and an episode from 1975 where Jim Peck falls while making his entrance down the stairs (which has made an appearance on The Most Outrageous Game Show Moments).

References

External links
 

Television shows based on dice games
American Broadcasting Company original programming
1970s American game shows
1974 American television series debuts
1975 American television series endings
Television series by Universal Television